The Conservatoire national supérieur de musique et de danse de Lyon, sometimes referred to as the Conservatoire de Lyon, is a conservatory for the study of music and dance, located in Lyon, France.

It is one of the two existing Conservatoire national supérieur de musique et de danse in France, the other being the Conservatoire de Paris in Paris.

About

Under the Ministry of Culture and Communication, CNSMDL is administered by a board whose chairman is appointed by the minister. The current director is Géry Moutier. He directs the conservatory with a deputy director. He is also assisted with a director of musical studies, a director of choreographic studies and a board of educational guidance. The teaching staff consists of 180 teachers, assistants and attendants. The administrative and technical team comprises 65 people. Enrollments are 500 musicians and 90 dancers. Foreign students account for 15% of the workforce.

The average season consists of nearly 300 public events that are part of the educational project, and help showcase the talent and the work of students, faculty and guest artists. Conservatory partnerships provide opportunities to expose students to the workplace.

The CNSMD Lyon is part of a network of fifty higher education institutions through the Erasmus exchange and also increases the projects with institutions outside Europe (in: Montreal, Bogota, Beirut). It has, for its projects and those of students, patronage of the SACEM, the Adams SPEDIDAM Patronage and Musical Société Générale, and for his actions at the international support of the Convention Cultures France, Region and DRAC Rhône-Alpes.

Structure

The Conservatory offers an education for future professionals, selected by competitive audition. The studies are organized in two distinct cycles approved by the Bologna scheme. The first cycle (3 years) is sanctioned by the National Diploma graduate professional musician / dancer (and DNSPM DNSMD), and the second (2 years) to a degree equal to the rank of master.

Departments

The faculty are grouped into ten departments:

 Department string
 Department timber
 Department brass
 Department keyboards
 Department voice and choral
 Department of Writing and composition
 Department early music
 Department of diploma course certificate of qualification (CA) music and dance
 Department of chamber music
 Department dance

Annual budget

The annual budget of the institution is €11,048,054 and a grant from the direction of music, dance, theater and amounts to €9,632,911.

Location

The CNSMD Lyon is located north of the district Old Lyon, quai Chauveau, in the 9th arrondissement of Lyon. Its historic buildings originally housed the Convent of the Sisters of St. Elizabeth (seventeenth century) and after the Revolution, became the speaker of the Veterinary School Lyon. The current layout of the premises was created by the architect Chabrol (mid-nineteenth century). In 1980, it was updated and expanded to accommodate the CNSMD Lyon.

Directors

 1980-1984: Pierre Cochereau
 1984-2000: Gilbert Amy
 2000-2009: Henry Fourès
 From September 2009: Géry Moutier.

Notable alumni
 Karen Gorden
 Adriana Kučerová
 Marc Soustrot (born 1949), conductor

References

External links

 CNSMD official website of Lyon 
 Effects of the Bologna Declaration on Professional Music Training in Europe
 site partly dedicated to creating the next doctorates in higher education institutions of music in Europe
 European Association of conservatory (AEC)
History of public institutions of the Ministry of Culture] (PDF)

Music schools in France
9th arrondissement of Lyon
Buildings and structures in Lyon
Education in Lyon
Dance schools in France
1980 establishments in France
Educational institutions established in 1980